Bogada Bhupathipur is a village in Medak mandal of Medak district in the Indian state of Telangana.

References

Villages in Medak district